Giuliana Anabel González Ranzuglia (born 18 June 2002), known as Giuliana González, is an Argentine footballer who plays as a defender for River Plate and the Argentina women's national team.

Club career
González has played for River Plate in Argentina.

International career
González represented Argentina at the 2020 South American Under-20 Women's Football Championship. She made her senior debut on 8 April 2021 in a 0–0 friendly draw against Venezuela.

References

External links

2002 births
Living people
People from José C. Paz Partido
Sportspeople from Buenos Aires Province
Argentine women's footballers
Women's association football defenders
Club Atlético River Plate (women) players
Argentina women's international footballers